The Ministry of Foreign Affairs (Ottoman Turkish: Hariciye Nezâreti) was the department of the Imperial Government responsible for the foreign relations of the Ottoman Empire, from its establishment in 1836 to its abolition in 1922. Before 1836, foreign relations were managed by the Reis ül-Küttab, who was replaced by a Western-style ministry as part of the Tanzimat modernization reforms. The successor of the Ottoman Ministry of Foreign Affairs is the Ministry of Foreign Affairs of the Turkish Republic.

French was officially the working language of the ministry in the period after the Crimean War.

Organisation
It was headed by a minister representing the Réis Effendi and a six-member council with sub-secretary of state (mustéchar) leading it. Other major figures included the Grand Master of Ceremonies of the head of the Drogmanat of the Imperial Divan and the Grand Master of Ceremonies (Techrifati-Hardjié) directed by the Introducer of Ambassadors.

Departments included:
Accounting (Direction de Comptabilité)
Chamber of Jurists (Bab-i-ali Istikharé Odassi, Chambre des Conseillers légistes)
Commercial Affairs (Tidjarié, Direction des Affaires Commerciales)
Consulates (Chehpendéri, Direction des Consulats)
Foreign Correspondence (Tahrirat-i-Hardjié, Direction de la Correspondance étrangère)
Foreign Press (Direction de la presse étrangère)
Litigation (Oumori-Houkoukié-i-Muhtélita, Direction du Contentieux)
Nationalities (Direction des Nationalités)
Personnel (Sigilli Ahwal, Direction du Personnel)
Translation (Terdjumé, Direction de Traduction)
Turkish Correspondence (Mektoubi-Hardjié, Direction de la Correspondance turque)

List of ministers
 Akif Pasha (1836)
 Ahmed Hulusi Pasha (1836-1837)
 Mustafa Reshid Pasha (1837-1838)
 Mehmed Nuri Efendi (1838-1839)
 Mustafa Reshid Pasha (1839-1841)
 Sadık Rıfat Pasha (1841)
 Ibrahim Sarim Pasha (1841-1843)
 Sadık Rıfat Pasha (1843-1844)
 Mehmed Shekib Efendi (1844)
 Mehmed Emin Âli Pasha (1844-1845)
 Mustafa Reshid Pasha (1845-1846)
 Mehmed Emin Âli Pasha (1846-1848)
 Sadık Rıfat Pasha (1848-1848)
 Mehmed Emin Âli Pasha (1848-1852)
 Keçecizade Fuad Pasha (1852-1853)
 Sadık Rıfat Pasha (1853)
 Mustafa Reshid Pasha (1853-1854)
 Mehmed Emin Âli Pasha (1854)
 Mehmed Esad Safvet Efendi (1854-1855) substitute minister
 Keçecizade Fuad Pasha (1855-1856)
 Mehmed Emin Âli Pasha (1856)
 İbrahim Edhem Pasha (1856-1857)
 Ali Galib Pasha (1857)
 Mehmed Emin Âli Pasha (1857)
 Keçecizade Fuad Pasha (1857-1858)
 Mahmud Nedim Pasha (1858-1860) substitute minister
 Mehmed Esad Safvet Efendi (1860) substitute minister
 Mehmed Emin Âli Pasha (1860-1861)
 Keçecizade Fuad Pasha (1861)
 Mehmed Emin Âli Pasha (1861-1867)
 Keçecizade Fuad Pasha (1867-1869)
 Mehmed Esad Safvet Pasha (1869)
 Mehmed Emin Âli Pasha (1869-1871)
 Server Pasha (1871-1872)
 Mehmed Cemil Pasha (1872)
 Halil Şerif Pasha (1872-1873)
 Mehmed Esad Saffet Pasha (1873)
 Mehmed Rashid Pasha (1873-1874)
 Ahmed Arifi Pasha (1874)
 Mehmed Esad Saffet Pasha (1874-1875)
 Mehmed Rashid Pasha (1875-1876)
 Mehmed Esad Saffet Pasha (1876-1877)
 Ahmed Arifi Pasha (1877)
 Server Pasha (1877-1878)
 Mehmed Esad Saffet Pasha (1878)
 Asım Mehmed Pasha (1878)
 Alexander Karatheodori Pasha (1878-1879)
 Mehmed Esad Saffet Pasha (1879)
 Sava Pasha (1879-1880)
 Abidin Pasha (1880)
 Asım Mehmed Pasha (1880-1881)
 Said Halim Pasha (1881-1882)
 Asım Mehmed Pasha (1882)
 Mehmed Esad Saffet Pasha (1882)
 Ahmed Arifi Pasha (1882-1884)
 Asım Mehmed Pasha (1884-1885)
 Said Halim Pasha (1885-1896)
 Turhan Pasha (1896-1899)
 Said Halim Pasha (1899)
 Ahmed Tevfik Pasha (1899-1909)
 Mehmed Rifat Pasha (1909-1911)
 İbrahim Hakkı Pasha (1911)
 Mustafa Asım Bey (1911-1912)
 Gabriel Noradunkyan (1912-1913)
 Said Halim Pasha (1913-1915)
 Halil Bey (1915-1917)
 Ahmed Nesimi Bey (1917-1918)
 Mehmed Nabi Bey (1918)
 Mustafa Reshid Pasha (1918-1919)
 Yusuf Franko Pasha (1919)
 Damat Ferid Pasha (1919)
 Abdüllatif Safa Bey (1919)
 Mustafa Reshid Pasha (1919-1920)
 Abdüllatif Safa Bey (1920)
 Damat Ferid Pasha (1920)
 Abdüllatif Safa Bey (1920-1921)
 Ahmed İzzet Pasha (1921-1922)

See also
 Foreign relations of the Ottoman Empire
 Ottoman Empire-United States relations
 Persian-Ottoman relations

References

External links
  - The abstract states that this was a department of the Ottoman Foreign Ministry
 

Foreign relations of the Ottoman Empire
Ottoman
Foreign Affairs
1836 establishments in the Ottoman Empire
1922 disestablishments in the Ottoman Empire